Navarajpur  is a “Rural Municipality” (Gaunpalika) previously known as “Village Development Committee (VDC). Rural Municipality is the newly formed lower administrative division in Nepal. The ministry of Federal Affairs and local development dissolved the existing VDC’s and announced the establishment of this new local bodies.

Navarajpur Gaunpalika is located in the south-eastern part of Siraha District of Nepal. The Navarajpur Gaunpalika consists of several villages, including Navarajpur, Tamasuiya, Naharniya, Jhajhpatti, Sunderpur, Kursandi, Menha, Devnagar, Phulwariya, Jagatpur, Majhaura, Dhekha, Karmaniya, Bhagwatipur and Geruwaha.

The office of the local bodies of Navarajpur Gaunpalika is presently located in the “Shree Janta Madhyamik Vidyalaya Sonwarsha’s” school's building.

The present Mayor of this Gaunpalika is Mr. shiv udgar yadav [shiva]

The village Navarajpur is one of the well known village in Siraha district of Nepal. The people of this village have been living in different parts of the country. Among 200 households the majority population of the village is YADAVA’S.
There are different religious places and temples in the village, among them “MAA HAJARI STHAN” is one of the most popular religious place in the village. The goddess is worshiped by all people of this village and even outsiders.

Nawajpur-01 (Geruwaha) is the beautiful among all the villages of nawrajpur Rural-Municipality . it has four gateway to enter inside the village, though the village is small has full of the greenery and has widespread land for farming. Most of the people of this village are engage with their farming and some also hold the government post in various field . The highest post is with Mr. Rijhan Yadav (DSP) also involve in private NGOS AND INGOS. Primitive culture and belief are very common to move on theirs life. DHOTI  by male where SARI by female  is main customs to have in any cultural programs. people do have very great faiths on Dhami and Jhakaris. Village is believed and is protected by Dihbar baba situated in western side st the village border connected with Tamasuiwa. Mr. Kashi yadav and Chabil yadav leads two different party  CPN and Janta samajwadi .The ward chairman in nawrajpur wada no.1 is Ms.Nabin kumar yadav.He is elected with Janta samajwadi party nepal.

External links
UN map of the municipalities of  Siraha District

Populated places in Siraha District
Rural municipalities of Nepal established in 2017
Rural municipalities in Madhesh Province